As a Franchise of the National Golden Gloves, the New England Golden Gloves is the annual amateur boxing competition for the New England States. It has been held every year since 1945 at the Lowell Memorial Auditorium in Lowell, Massachusetts. Competitors over the years include boxing greats, such as; Rocky Marciano, Sugar Ray Leonard, Marvin Hagler, and Micky Ward. The competitions typically take place in January through February, with the winners heading to the National Golden Gloves in May.

History
In 1946 Robert Edward Seavey Sr. won the Golden Gloves at the age of 17, registered under the name of his older brother Albert. He won the Championship title again in 1947.

In the 1960s Ralph Lally, from Lowell, Massachusetts fought in the 75 Golden Glove bout with 67 KOs. His pro and Olympic hopes were dashed by his draft into the Vietnam War.

In 1971, the "Boxing Doctor" Harold Reitman was champion in the heavyweight division while in medical school.

In 1973, The New England Franchise (Lowell, Massachusetts) Hosted the National Tournament of Champions.

In the early 1980s pro boxer Micky Ward was 3 time New England Golden Gloves Champion.

In 1976-1980 pro boxer Irish Danny Cronin was 4 time new England golden gloves champion.

From 1987-88. runner-up Lowell. Ma.John J Wojcik Jr. 2 time silver mittens Champion  won 3 New England Golden Gloves Championships and was also a national runner-up on two occasions, in 1987 and 1988.

In 1995, The New England Franchise (Lowell, Massachusetts) Hosted the National Tournament of Champions.

1996 U.S. Olympic team captain Lawrence Clay-Bey won several super heavyweight titles at Lowell in the mid-1990s as did future IBO super bantamweight champion Mike "Machine Gun" Oliver.

In the 2000s pro boxer Danny O'Connor was a 4 time New England Golden Gloves Champion.

In the 2000s pro boxer "Too Smooth" Matt Godfrey was a  New England Golden Gloves Champion as was his friend and stablemate, 2004 U.S. Olympian Jason Estrada.

In 2002 & 2004-2006, pro heavyweight "The Storm" Nathaniel James was 3 time New England Golden Gloves Champion.

In 2009, Boston Marathon bomber Tamerlan Tsarnaev won the open heavyweight.

List of National Winners from New England

1962- 112 lbs: Ray Jutrus

1969- 165 lbs: Roosevelt Molden

1974- 178 lbs: Robert Stewart

1993- 165 lbs: Tarvis Simms

2001- Jay Paquette

2000- Shw: Steve Vukosa

2002- 165 lbs: Jaidon Codrington & 201 lbs: Matthew Godfrey

2006- 152 lbs: Demetrius Andrade  & 165 lbs: Edwin Rodriquez

2007- 152 lbs: Demetrius Andrade

2008- 112 lbs: Jorge Aiague & 141 lbs: Daniel O'Connor

2010- 123 lbs: Toka Kahn-Clary & 165 lbs: Ronald Ellis

2011- 123 lbs: Tramaine Williams

References 

Amateur boxing Timothy Ottman  New England  Golden Glove Champion  1969 to 1971 light weight record 32 wins 0 loss 1 draw
Golden Gloves